Newbury High School was a public high school in Newbury Township, Geauga County, Ohio from 1927 to 2020. At the conclusion of the 2019–20 academic year, the school executed a territory transfer into the West Geauga School District. In 2022, both school buildings were demolished and as of January 1, 2023, all that remains are the overgrown remnants of the football stadium, a playground, and the old bus garage.

Athletics

Newbury High School's mascot was the Black Knight. In 1968, Newbury was a founding member of the East Suburban Conference (ESC) Ohio Northeast Region defunct athletic conferences#East Suburban Conference after spending many years in the old Geauga County League (GCL). The Black Knights were members of the ESC for 30 years before moving to the Chagrin Valley Conference (CVC) OHSAA Northeast Region athletic conferences#Chagrin Valley Conference in 1998, where they remained until they joined the Northeastern Athletic Conference (NAC) OHSAA Northeast Region athletic conferences#Northeastern Athletic Conference in 2014 .

Ohio High School Athletic Association State Championships

 Boys Wrestling – 1986

External links
 District Website (as of 2022, forwards to West Geauga Schools website)

References

High schools in Geauga County, Ohio
Public high schools in Ohio